The 1970 German Open Championships was a combined men's and women's tennis tournament played on outdoor red clay courts. It was the 62nd edition of the tournament, the first one in the Open Era, and took place at the Am Rothenbaum in Hamburg, West Germany, from 10 August through 17 August 1970. First-seeded Tom Okker and Helga Schultze-Hösl won the singles titles.

Finals

Men's singles
 Tom Okker defeated  Ilie Năstase 4–6, 6–3, 6–3, 6–4

Women's singles
 Helga Hösl Schultze defeated  Helga Niessen 6–3, 6–3

Men's doubles
 Bob Hewitt /  Frew McMillan defeated  Tom Okker /  Nikola Pilić 6–3, 7–5, 6–2

Women's doubles
 Karen Krantzcke /  Kerry Melville defeated  Winnie Shaw /  Virginia Wade 6–0, 6–1

Mixed doubles
 Judy Dalton /  Frew McMillan defeated  Evonne Goolagong /  Bob Hewitt 6–4, 6–4

References

External links
  
   
 Association of Tennis Professionals (ATP) tournament profile

Hamburg European Open
German Open Championships
1970 in West German sport
German